A shuttle is a tool designed to neatly and compactly store a holder that carries the thread of the weft yarn while weaving with a loom. Shuttles are thrown or passed back and forth through the shed, between the yarn threads of the warp in order to weave in the weft.

The simplest shuttles, known as "stick shuttles", are made from a flat, narrow piece of wood with notches on the ends to hold the weft yarn. More complicated shuttles incorporate bobbins or pirns.

In the United States, shuttles are often made of wood from the flowering dogwood, because it is hard, resists splintering, and can be polished to a very smooth finish. In the United Kingdom shuttles were usually made of boxwood, cornel, or persimmon.

Flying shuttle

Shuttles were originally passed back and forth by hand. However, John Kay invented a loom in 1733 that incorporated a flying shuttle. This shuttle could be thrown through the warp, which allowed much wider cloth to be woven much more quickly and made the development of machine looms much simpler. Though air-jet and water-jet looms are common in large operations, many companies still use flying shuttle looms. This is due in large part to their being easier to maintain than the more modern looms. In modern flying shuttle looms, the shuttle itself is made of rounded steel, with a hook in the back which carries the filler, or "pick."

Health issues
The act of "kissing the shuttle", in which weavers used their mouths to pull thread through the eye of a shuttle when the pirn was replaced, contributed to the spread of disease.

Gallery

References 
 Chandler, Deborah (1995). Learning to Weave, Loveland, Colorado: Interweave Press LLC.

External links

Pak Shuttle Company (Pvt) Ltd.

Heraldic charges
Weaving equipment